The Boyd and Parker ambush was a minor military engagement in what is now Groveland, New York on September 13, 1779, during the American Revolutionary War. A scouting patrol of the Sullivan Expedition was ambushed by Loyalist soldiers led by Major John Butler and their Seneca allies led by Cornplanter and Little Beard.

Background
Native American raids in Upstate New York resulted in General George Washington sending Major General John Sullivan with several thousand soldiers into the Finger Lakes Region to displace the Seneca and Cayuga; destroy their villages, crops and food stores; and remove the threat to settlers.

Prelude
Butler and the Seneca war chiefs had roughly 800 men to defend Seneca territory including Butler's Rangers. Sullivan had marched from Easton, Pennsylvania to the Wyoming Valley, then ascended the Susquehanna River to its confluence with the Chemung River. 

After defeating Butler at the Battle of Newtown, Sullivan headed north into the Seneca homeland. His brigades proceeded up the eastern side of Seneca Lake to Kanadaseaga before heading west towards Chenussio, also known as Little Beard's Town.

Sullivan had camped at the site of Foot’s Corners in Conesus on Sunday, September 12, 1779, after marching from Honeoye Lake. That night, Lieutenant Thomas Boyd received orders to organize a scouting party to locate and reconnoiter Chenussio. Boyd took 26 soldiers with him including Sergeant Michael Parker. Also with him was Thaosagawat, an Oneida guide also known as Han Yost.

Meanwhile, about 400 Rangers and allied warriors were preparing to ambush the vanguard of Sullivan's army as it emerged from the marshy area south of Conesus Lake, unaware that Boyd's patrol had unknowingly passed them in the night.

Ambush

The following morning Boyd's patrol reached an abandoned village which he believed was Chenussio. After sending four runners back to Sullivan they spotted a group of four Seneca entering the village and a brief skirmish followed. One Seneca was killed. Boyd then decided to return with his patrol to Sullivan's camp. On the trail they spotted five Iroquois who fled. Thaosagawat warned Boyd not to follow but he ignored the warning, and the patrol stumbled upon the enemy’s lines. Surrounded and outnumbered, fourteen of Boyd’s men were killed. Seven escaped, while Boyd, Parker and Thaosagwat were captured. Thaosagawat was immediately executed by Little Beard.

Aftermath 

Boyd and Parker were taken to Chenussio, where Butler questioned them. After Butler departed, Little Beard had Boyd and Parker tortured, mutilated and decapitated in anger over the destruction of Seneca villages. According to one source, Boyd had his entrails drawn out, however, this particular detail is not included in the journals kept by several members of the Sullivan Expedition which describe the condition of the mangled bodies in gruesome detail.

A tree, thought to be the tree to which Boyd was bound, is located in the Boyd and Parker Park in Leicester, New York.

The bodies of Boyd and Parker were discovered by Sullivan's forces on September 14, and the men were buried with full military honors. Chenussio was razed to the ground and the extensive fields of corn and vegetables surrounding it were destroyed. Sullivan then turned his army around and headed back towards Seneca Lake. The bodies of Thaosagwat and the 14 soldiers who died at the ambush site were discovered two days later.

Besides Boyd, Parker and Thaosagawat, the names of 12 of the killed are known and are inscribed on a memorial located in Rochester, New York. One name on the memorial, Corporal Calhoun, refers to a soldier who died of his wounds in a separate encounter the same day as the Boyd and Parker ambush.

Memorials
The remains of Boyd and Parker were left buried at the site of their deaths until 1841, when they were re-interred at Rochester's Mount Hope Cemetery in a ceremony attended by New York Governor William H. Seward.

Today the Groveland Ambuscade Monument Monument marks the site of the ambush inside a small park, which was listed on the National Register of Historic Places in 2009.  In September 2004 the ambush's 225th anniversary was commemorated at the site with an reenactment.

References

1779 in the United States
Conflicts in 1779
Battles in the Northern theater of the American Revolutionary War after Saratoga
Battles involving Native Americans
Battles involving the United States
Battles involving Great Britain
Livingston County, New York
Battles of the American Revolutionary War in New York (state)
1779 in New York (state)
Ambushes